Bourguignon is a French surname. Notable people with the surname include:

André Bourguignon, French psychiatrist
François Bourguignon, French economist
Erika Bourguignon, American anthropologist
Jean-Pierre Bourguignon, French mathematician
Louis Dominique Bourguignon, French highwayman
Philippe Bourguignon, French businessman

French-language surnames
Toponymic surnames
Ethnonymic surnames